Natalya Glebova (née Shive, born 30 April 1963) is a Russian speed skater who competed for the Soviet Union in the 1984 and 1988 Winter Olympics. In 1984 she won the bronze medal in the 500 m event. In the 1000 m competition she finished 37th. Four years later she finished ninth in the 500 m contest and 20th in the 1000 m event.

Her first international competitions were the 1982 European Championships where she won three bronze medals (all-around, 1,000 m and 1,500 m) and a silver medal in the 500 m. Next year she won a silver and a gold medal in the 500 m at the European and World All-around Championships, respectively, and finished eights overall. At the 1984 World Championships she again won silver in the 500 m. During her career, Glebova won six national titles: all-around in 1983, sprint all-around in 1984, 1,000 m in 1982 and 1984, 3,000 m in 1983, and 5,000 m in 1983. She retired after the 1988 Olympics.

Personal bests: 
500 m – 40.39 (1983)
1000 m – 1:22.22 (1984)
1500 m – 2:09.36 (1982)
 3000 m – 4:37.97 (1983)
5000 m – 8:07.20 (1983)

References

1963 births
Living people
Soviet female speed skaters
Olympic speed skaters of the Soviet Union
Speed skaters at the 1984 Winter Olympics
Speed skaters at the 1988 Winter Olympics
Olympic bronze medalists for the Soviet Union
Olympic medalists in speed skating
Russian female speed skaters
Medalists at the 1984 Winter Olympics